Matthew Macklin (born 14 May 1982) is a British-Irish former professional boxer who competed from 2001 to 2016, and has since worked as a boxing manager and commentator. He challenged three times for middleweight world titles between 2011 and 2013, and held multiple regional championships at that weight: the Irish title from 2005 to 2006, the British title in 2009, and the European title from 2009 to 2011.

Early life
Macklin was born in Birmingham, England to Irish parents, his father being from County Roscommon and his mother from County Tipperary. He is a dual citizen and travels on an Irish passport.

Macklin and his brother Seamus, also a boxer, spent entire summers and much of their youth in their mother's native county. It was there that he learned how to play one of Ireland's national sports, hurling, and he is still an avid supporter of Tipperary today. He became a talented player in his own right, and is a close friend of now retired hurler Eoin Kelly. Macklin attends the Poc fada and other GAA events when Tipperary are playing.

Following his education at the independent Solihull School, at the age of 18 and whilst studying law at Coventry University as an amateur boxer, Macklin won the 2001 national senior ABA welterweight title for the Small Heath Boxing Club by beating Justin Turley in the final.

Professional career

Debut fight
Macklin left the amateur ranks and turned professional in September 2001, winning his first fight at the Bellahouston Sports Centre, Glasgow, Scotland, in which Macklin beat previously undefeated Ram Singh from Wisbech in a first-round knockout on a card which included Scottish fighters Scott Harrison, Alex Arthur and Willie Limond.

Macklin vs. Jamie Moore
In September 2006, Macklin was involved in his highest profile fight when he was defeated in a fight of the year contender bout against Manchester's Jamie Moore for the British light middleweight title which took place at the George Carnell Leisure Centre, Davyhulme, Manchester, England. Macklin later confessed to having major problems trying to make the weight for the fight. It was one of the best action fights ever held in a British boxing ring and nearly won 2006 Fight of The Year.

Potential Duddy fight

There was speculation of a potential Irish title fight against New York based Derry native John Duddy. In the summer of 2006 Macklin made a guest appearance in Dublin to hand over the Irish middleweight title to fellow stablemate Dubliner Jim Rock.

At post fight press conference John Duddy's then matchmaker Jim Borzell stated that if Macklin won "the European title then maybe you'll have something John wants." Macklin replied, "maybe I have something for him he doesn't want!".

In December 2009, Macklin moved closer to a world title shot with a points victory over Rafa Sosa Pintos at the National Stadium in Dublin. The fight never happened and Duddy retired in 2011.

European middleweight champion
Macklin beat Finnish Super-fighter Amin Asikainen by brutal 1st-round KO at the Manchester Velodrome, England on 25 September 2009 for the vacant European middleweight title.

Matthew Macklin was later forced to vacate his European title. However he would get in first for the fight for the vacant title. A fight against Englishman Darren Barker was arranged for 18 September 2010 on Frank Warren's Magnificent Seven bill on Sky Box Office. The fight would be a big step closer to a world title fight for both men however Barker was forced to pull out of the contest through injury only weeks before the fight. He was replaced with Georgian slugger Shalva Jomardashvili and won the fight via a technical knock out two seconds into the sixth round after shoma pulled out. Macklin regained his EBU title and stated after the fight he wanted to go on to fight for a world title next.

World title challenges
Mathew fought WBA Middleweight champion Felix Sturm on 25 June 2011. The fight ended in a controversial split decision win for Sturm.

On 17 March 2012 otherwise known as St. Patrick's Day. Matthew Macklin met WBC Diamond Middleweight champion Sergio Martinez in Madison Square Garden, New York City. Macklin would go on to lose that fight after his corner retired him on his stool after round 11, a round in which Macklin was dropped twice near the end by massive straight lefts from the southpaw Martinez after gaining a slight lead on the scorecards in the middle rounds. See Sergio Martinez vs. Matthew Macklin

Career rebuilding
Coming off two consecutive losses in title fights, Macklin came back on 15 September 2012, he fought on HBO World Championship Boxing PPV on the undercard of the WBC World Middleweight Title fight between Mexico's then defending WBC Middleweight Champion Julio César Chávez, Jr. and Argentina's Lineal Middleweight Champion Sergio Martínez in the Thomas & Mack Center in Paradise, Nevada. Macklin fought former Light-Middleweight world champion Joachim Alcine (33–2, 19 KO's) of Canada and won with a knockout in the first round. On 30 June 2013, he suffered another setback with a loss to Gennady Golovkin by KO in the 3rd round when Golovkin landed a brutal left hook to the liver.

Retirement
Follow a devastating knockout loss to Argentine contender Jorge Sebastian Heiland, Macklin took some time off from the sport, being undecided on whether he would retire or not. In the meantime, he set up the Macklin's Gym Marbella gym in Marbella, Spain with Daniel Kinahan. Past his best but in hopes of one final title shot, Macklin returned the following year and took part in a couple of easy warm up fights, before dropping down a weight division to defeat domestic level Jason Welborn. He won by close 10 round unanimous decision, on a packed card in his home town of Birmingham. Macklin then defeated former world title challenger Brian Rose by a narrow 12 round majority decision on the Anthony Joshua-Charles Martin undercard. Shortly after the Rose fight, Macklin announced his retirement on May 13, 2016. Having struggled with fighters who he feels he would have beaten comprehensively a few years earlier, Macklin saw it was time to finally hang up the gloves.

In 2017 Macklin announced that his partner Kinahan would be stepping back from boxing promotion due to bad publicity. The gym rebranded as MTK - Mack the Knife, as MGM Resorts International filed a trademark lawsuit over its use of the 'MGM' initials. MTK was bought out by external investors, with Matthew Macklin remaining on the board in an advisory capacity.

He became a pundit for Sky Sports.

In April 2022 Macklin was prevented from boarding a flight to the United States at a London airport because of links to Daniel Kinahan. He was travelling to Las Vegas to cover a fight between Shakur Stevenson and Óscar Valdez on 30 April.

Professional boxing record

References

External links

1982 births
Living people
Boxers from Birmingham, West Midlands
Alumni of Coventry University
British people of Irish descent
British male boxers
Light-middleweight boxers
Middleweight boxers
European Boxing Union champions
British Boxing Board of Control champions
Boxing commentators